JT Playaz are a European neo-disco group, produced by Giles Goodman and Mark Summers  (Scorccio).  They recorded a UK number 30 hit single, "Just Playin'" (1997), and were subsequently featured on many compilations including Dancemania's sixth issue and in the music video game Dance Dance Revolution. Their other UK Singles Chart entry was "Let's Get Down", which reached number 64 in May 1998.

Discography

Singles

References

Video game musicians